Jalapa is a village and also the Village Development Committee  of Khotang District in the Sagarmatha Zone of eastern Nepal is located here. At the time of the 1991 Nepal census, it had a population of 2,351 persons living in 448 individual households.

Jalapa consists of other villages such as Kharbari, Purano Gau and Ghale Gau. Most maps of Nepali does not indicate these villages.

References
2. Administrative area of Jalapa (Nepal)

External links
UN map of the municipalities of Khotang District
Kharmi
Dumi language

Populated places in Khotang District